Panay, officially the Municipality of Panay (Capiznon/Hiligaynon: Banwa sang Panay), is a 3rd class municipality in the province of Capiz, Philippines. According to the 2020 census, it has a population of 48,890 people.

Pronounced as Pan-ay, it used to be the provincial capital of Capiz.

Panay is the site of the famous coral-stone Santa Monica Church, home to the largest Catholic Church bell in Asia.

History
The town originally called Bamban was changed by the early Spaniards to Panay, a word which means “mouth of the river.” This is also the location of a fortress built by Juan de la Isla in late 1570. The Paseo de Evangelización 1566 can be found in the town plaza and was erected through the efforts of Rev. Msgr. Benjamin F. Advíncula. 1566 was the year the Spaniards arrived in the island of Panay and became the second Spanish settlement in the country next to Cebu.

Miguel López de Legazpi transferred the Spanish settlement from Cebu to Panay in 1569 due to the lack of food. The town was formally founded in 1572 (1581 according to Jorde), although by that time López de Legazpi had moved the capital of the Philippines, further north, to Manila. Fr. Bartolomé de Alcántara was named the prior of the town with Fr. Agustín Camacho as assistant. A prosperous town due to trade, Panay became capital of captivating Capiz for two centuries until Capiz was named capital. The town name was eventually given to whole island. After 1607, Fr. Alonso de Méntrida, noted for his linguistic studies and Visayan dictionary became prior. In the 18th century, Panay was famous for its textile industry which produced a cloth called suerte and exported to Europe. In the 19th century, Don Antonio Roxas, grandfather of Pres. Manuel Roxas, opened one of the largest rum and wine distilleries in the town. The Augustinians held the parish until 1898, when administration transferred to the seculars.

The first church was built before 1698 when it is reported that a typhoon had ruined it. In 1774, Fr. Miguel Murguía rebuilt the church, but it was later damaged by a typhoon on 15 January 1875. Fr. José Beloso restored the church in 1884. The church is best known for its 10.4 ton bell popularly called dakong lingganay (big bell). The bell was cast by Don Juan Reina who settled in Iloilo in 1868. Reina, who was the town dentist, was also noted for being a metal caster and smith. The bell was cast at Panay from 70 sacks of coins donated by the townspeople. The bell was completed in 1878. It bears an inspiring inscription which translated reads: “I am God’s voice which shall echo praise from one end of the town of Panay to the other, so that Christ’s faithful followers may enter this house of God to receive heavenly graces.”

Geography

Barangays
Panay is politically subdivided into 42 barangays.

Climate

Demographics

Economy

References

External links

Official Website of Municipality of Panay
 [ Philippine Standard Geographic Code]
Philippine Census Information

Municipalities of Capiz
Former provincial capitals of the Philippines